Peter Moir Haining (born 3 April 1962) is a male Scottish-born rower and three-time World Lightweight Sculling Champion who competed for Great Britain and England.

Biography
Haining was born at Dumbarton, Scotland, the son of Jackie and Betty Haining. His father and sister were rowers, and he learnt to row at Loch Lomond Rowing Club. He attended Levenvale Primary School and Vale of Leven Academy and left school to start apprenticeship as painter and decorator, but as international level rowing in the UK at the time was centred on London he went south to join London Rowing Club.

In 1984 he went to Nottingham to the National lightweight squad after being impressed by a Nottinghamshire County Rowing Association four at Henley. His first international success came in the 1986 Commonwealth Games, where the GB lightweight four, rowing as England, won gold. Haining would never row for Scotland at the Commonwealth Games. He also won two silver medals at the World Rowing Championships in the lightweight coxless four in 1986 and 1987 and bronze in the lightweight eight in 1990.

In 1990 when he was persistently late for training in the eight, his coach pushed him into single sculling.

Although a lightweight rower, Haining competed for Great Britain at the 1992 Summer Olympics in Barcelona, in the unplaced quadruple scull.  He was then World Champion in lightweight single sculls in 1993, 1994 and 1995. Rowing for Auriol Kensington Rowing Club, he won the Wingfield Sculls in 1994, 1995, and 1996  and competed in the single scull at the 1996 Summer Olympics in Atlanta, finishing 11th overall, rather than competing in one of the lightweight events introduced at that games.

Haining was runner up to Greg Searle in the Diamond Challenge Sculls at Henley in 1997  and won a silver medal at the  World Championships lightweight coxless pairs in 1998. In 2000 he won the Wingfield Sculls again. His last international appearance before retiring was in the GB lightweight eight at the World Rowing Championships in 2002.

In 2005 Haining joined Richard Spratley as coach at Oxford Brookes University Boat Club  
where he was responsible for training all crews including that winning The Temple Challenge Cup in 2006.

For a period around 2010 Haining coached at Lady Margaret Hall Boat Club.

References

1962 births
Living people
Olympic rowers of Great Britain
Rowers at the 1992 Summer Olympics
Rowers at the 1996 Summer Olympics
Scottish male rowers
English male rowers
Rowers at the 1986 Commonwealth Games
Commonwealth Games gold medallists for England
World Rowing Championships medalists for Great Britain
Commonwealth Games medallists in rowing
Sportspeople from Dumbarton
Medallists at the 1986 Commonwealth Games